"First Love / Late Spring" is a song by Japanese-American singer Mitski, released in 2014 as the lead single from her third studio album, Bury Me at Makeout Creek. The song was included in the seventh episode of Conversations with Friends.

Background
In an interview with Drew Allen, Mitski said that she got the inspiration for the song from real life. "I was falling in love with someone when I seriously could not afford to, considering where my life was at the moment. But it happened anyway because you can't control that shit", she said. When asked about what the line "Mune ga hachikire-sōde" means, Mitski said "it roughly means 'my chest is about to burst'."

Reception
AllMusic considered "First Love / Late Spring" to be one of the album's highlights, and wrote that it adopts a "mocking, '60s girl group approximation".

Consequence placed the song on the fifth spot of their top 10 Mitski songs list, writing that "the chorus layered with group vocals [makes it] seem to mimic her blithering dread."

References

2014 singles
2014 songs
Mitski songs